Olde Town Arvada, the  historic district in Arvada, Colorado bounded by Ralston Road, Teller Road, Grandview Avenue and Yukon Street. It was listed on the National Register of Historic Places in 1998.  The listing included 42 contributing buildings.

Its 1998 NRHP nomination stated:The district is characterized by a variety of building types, including some of the most significant historic residences in the city, the largest concentration of historic business buildings in the city, the oldest Grange hall in the state, one of the few historic industrial facilities established in Arvada, and three substantial historic churches. Many of the buildings within the district were designed to fulfill more than onex function, such as business blocks which had commercial space on the ground floor and living quarters or community halls on the upper floor. This combination of building functions within the downtown area typified Arvada's early history. Diversity of function led to the variety of construction materials, styles, landscaping, and setbacks within the district.

It includes:
A.L. Davis Block building (1916), at 5600 Wadsworth Boulevard, a garage and Dodge and Chevrolet dealership, built of red brick, later expanded to absorb the 1882 school building that was to its north
First National Bank of Arvada (1903), at 7530 Grandview Avenue
more

It is home to many local restaurants, breweries, taverns, and shops. The RTD commuter rail G-Line has a stop in Olde Town.

See also
National Register of Historic Places listings in Jefferson County, Colorado

References

Downtown
Historic districts on the National Register of Historic Places in Colorado
Neighborhoods in Colorado
National Register of Historic Places in Jefferson County, Colorado